Sandown Bay Academy, formerly Sandown High School, was an academy status secondary school located in Sandown on the Isle of Wight, England. From 2012 to 31 August 2018 it was sponsored by the Academies Enterprise Trust. On 31 August 2018, the academy closed.

History
Education at the current school site began with Sandown Grammar School, which had a long and distinguished history during the twentieth century.
The school became Sandown High School in 1970 when the former Sandown Grammar and Fairway Secondary Modern schools merged to form Sandown High School. In 2005 Sandown High School became a sports college and regularly topped all the Isle of Wight sporting leagues and events.

In 2008 it was decided that the Isle of Wight education system should be changed from a three-tier system to a two-tier system, in line with the majority of schools in England and Wales, and that the new schools should be academies. A range of organisations were invited to bid to run the new Secondary school academies. Academies Enterprise Trust (AET) competed against the Island Innovation Trust and the "East Wight Educational Trust" and presented a proposal for a high achieving outstanding academy. AET was subsequently awarded the contract to run the new Sandown Bay Academy, named after the bay it is located on. It opened as an AET school with 2005 pupils, making it one of the largest schools in England at that time. Due to the very large number of pupils, the site of nearby former Sandham Middle School was incorporated into the site and called "North School."

The last headteacher of Sandown High School and first Principal of Sandown Bay Academy was John Bradshaw. The Principal of Sandown Bay Academy from Sept 2012 until November 2013 was Shaheen Khan Jones. She was replaced by Eric Jackson who was Principal until Sept 2015, when Claire Charlemagne took over, until her resignation for Sept 2017.

Academic standards and improvement
The national measure of school performance until 2015 was the proportion of pupils gaining 5 GCSEs A-C grade (including English and Maths). From 2016 the measure of school performance changed to "progress 8." Both sets of data are included in the following table.

Five years after AET took over Sandown Bay Academy, in order to bring about "world class learning outcomes" the GCSE 2016 results for Sandown Bay Academy are the worst ever achieved by the school and the new performance measure of "progress 8" places the school amongst the 10% of lowest achieving schools in England.

The results of A level pupils (aged 18) have also collapsed. At the point that AET took over Sandown Bay Academy, A level results placed the Academy in the top 25% of schools in England, with one third of the Sixth Form pupils graduating and proceeding to study at prestigious Russell Group universities (including Oxford and Cambridge) in 2013. Standards have steadily fallen, with the academy delivering the wrong course material to students, followed by OFSTED criticism of "disappointing" A level results and "unexpected U grades"(OFSTED Nov 2015). By 2017 only 4% of students at Sandown Bay Academy were achieving the AAB grades necessary to go to top Russell Group universities (compared to the national average of 17%).

OFSTED have repeatedly raised concerns. In Spring 2013 OFSTED stated that standards were 'inadequate' and placed the academy in Special Measures, before going on in May 2013 to criticise the Academy Improvement Plan as not-fit-for purpose and in October 2013 the Academy was criticised for being too slow to bring about improvement. At the same time the UK Department for Education also wrote to the Academies Enterprise Trust complaining about the "unacceptably low" academic standards at Sandown Bay Academy. AET promised urgent improvements in 2013, but four years later Sandown Bay Academy achieved its worst ever set of GCSE results and found itself ranked amongst the lowest achieving 10% of schools in England.

AET have tried a range of strategies to improve Sandown Bay Academy. They began by appointing a "Regional Director of Education" (RDE) who would oversee standards in the Academy. The first RDE was Jonathan de Sausmarez, who in 2012 was responsible for appointing the first Principal, and responsible for "securing rapid school improvement and the best possible progress for all pupils." When Sandown Bay Academy went into Special Measures in 2013, he was replaced by a senior AET executive, David Fuller (the national AET "Director of Secondary Schools"). David Fuller's big idea was to appoint a "superhead" to turn Sandown Bay Academy around.

The "Superhead" strategy for turning schools around can be very successful, but it has also received a lot of criticism because some "superheads" cost a lot of money but leave a school in a poor state with continuing poor exam results. AET appointed Mr Eric Jackson as the superhead at Sandown Bay Academy from 2013 to 2015. He went on to work at Ryde Academy in 2015 (when their exam results dipped), before then going on to help Everest Academy in 2016 (when their results also went backwards).

The superhead plan came to an end in 2015 when GCSE results at Sandown Bay Academy were lower than the 48% achieved five years earlier in 2010, before the school had even became an AET school. This led to OFSTED stating that the Academy was "not taking effective action" because "The pace of improvement in the academy has been too slow. Recommendations... have not been acted on urgently, or sharply enough. (Nov 2015)"

With the failure of the Superhead plan, David Fuller left Sandown Bay Academy to concentrate on improving other schools, such as by being a Trustee at Unity City Academy, which subsequently sank further into poor standards, went into the bottom 10% of schools in England and went into Special Measures for a second time as an AET Academy. AET next asked Jonathan de Sausmarez to return as RDE and to have another go at "bringing about rapid improvement."

AET's next "big idea" to turn around the declining results was to having a management board to run the Academy, chaired by Beverley Perin, another one of the AET senior executives. Beverley Perin is advertised by AET as a "lead OFSTED inspector" who leads on ensuring that "quantifiable improvement" takes place in AET Academies, (and so she is also a trustee raising standards at Unity City Academy which has gone backwards into Special Measures twice under AET). After two years of management board support from 2015 AET's results in 2017 have gone backwards and placed the school amongst the lowest achieving 10% of schools in England.

Unsurprisingly, OFSTED finally lost patience with AET in 2017 and put Sandown Bay Academy into Special Measures for its second time as an AET Academy, stating that pupils had been "let down in the quality of education which they receive, for too long". The local authority responded by stating that "...AET should hang their heads in shame and apologise unreservedly for their complete failure to support and develop what should by now have been a good school. Pam Wheeler of the Parents action group said "AET couldn't sell ice cream on the pier."

After five years of failing to improve the Academy, local politicians were losing patience. Councillor Whitehouse, the leader for education on the Isle of Wight, stated: "In my view, the organisation (AET) is simply not up to the job and should be relieved of its responsibilities and replaced by a sponsor that can deliver the improvements and expertise that Sandown Bay Academy needs..." In an almost unprecedented move, 450 pupils staged a sit-in protest calling for AET to be fired, chanting "get AET out the door," whilst parents organised protest marches.

AET's new CEO, Julian Drinkall, effectively blamed the governors for the poor standards at Sandown Bay Academy and said that they would be sacked and replaced with a management board. The governors responded by accusing AET of "unprofessional and inept behaviour" as no one from AET had actually told them they were being sacked and they had been left to discover the fact from the Media.

Unfortunately, the AET executives do not seem to have told their CEO that AET had already been trying a management board to raise standards for the previous two years, and that that management board plan had failed.  By 2017 AET had tried throwing their top executives at the Academy, they had tried a "superhead" and they had already tried a "Management Board," so the proposal of a new management board plan had to be hastily withdrawn (and an apology was given to Sandown Bay Academy parents for leaving them to hear about that plan from the Media). Other AET academies, which are similarly failing and incapable of improvement, are offloaded by AET onto other Academy chains (at a cost to AET of £38m in 2015 (according to AET's own accounts)).  For example, East Point Academy went into Special Measures and had 3 years of declining results as an AET academy, before being given to the Inspiration Trust whereupon results immediately improved and the Academy was graded as "good" by OFSTED. Everest Academy is another AET academy which has had five years of poor results, being below the minimum standard for schools (40%) for 4 of those five years, and so it is being offloaded by AET to the Bourne Education Trust for Sept 2017, and Cordeaux Academy where standards have also collapsed so badly that the AET have been asked by the UK government to transfer the school to an academy trust which is able to improve schools: the Tollbar Multi Academy Trust

Following their practice elsewhere, the next plan that AET could have tried would have been seeing if some other Academy chain would take over Sandown Bay Academy (which as it happens is now exactly what the Isle of Wight Local Authority is trying to arrange). However the fact that AET themselves did not seem to want to hand over to another academy chain has been attributed to what Councillor Chris quirk refers to their "being driven by money." Unbeknown to many residents of the Isle of Wight, the neighbouring Ryde Academy (which is also controlled by AET and which is just 6 miles from Sandown Bay Academy) happens to have an extraordinary "surplus" of £1.3m (of money which should have been spent on Isle of Wight children) sitting in its school bank account, unspent. and so any plan for Sandown Bay Academy had to be a plan which did not risk losing control of Ryde Academy to another Academy chain which might take over Sandown Bay Academy.

AET's annual accounts in 2016 make it clear that the Academy chain is potentially in very serious financial difficulties, as deficits are increasing in many of its academies. So AET's final improvement plan for Sandown Bay Academy was to "close" Sandown Bay academy and merge it with Ryde Academy, thus ending the embarrassment of being unable to improve Sandown Bay Academy, whilst retaining control of Ryde Academy and its financial assets.

Unfortunately this "closure plan" for Sandown Bay Academy was received extremely badly on the Isle of Wight. Councillor Howe said that AET should be "ashamed of themselves." Julian Critchley, the Labour Party candidate for the Isle of Wight in the General Election of 2017, went further and stated: "The answer to Sandown Bay Academy’s issues is not to impose their problems on Ryde Academy, but to fix the problems in Sandown. Clearly, that is something which AET are incapable of doing."

Mr Critchley's concerns that Ryde Academy could be destroyed by merging Sandown Bay Academy with it are well founded, as the contrast between Ryde Academy and Sandown Bay Academy is stark. Sandown Bay Academy, to the despair of those who remembered the excellent grammar school that was destroyed to help create it, was declared inadequate, sank into a budget deficit and went through constant rounds of redundancies unable to improve whilst AET threw its top executives and best resources at it. Ryde Academy, however, was also graded 'inadequate' but rapidly moved to become "good." It successfully overcame a deficit, and it improved by systematically confronting problems and grasping nettles to challenge poor performance, union activism and pupil indiscipline; even when doing so led to public criticism at the time. Ryde Academy arguably improved despite AET as Ian Comfort the CEO of AET intervened publicly to try and stop Ryde Academy challenging poor performance. By 2017, the contrast between the schools is stark. Instead of trying to run Ryde Academy like Sandown Bay Academy, if AET had run Sandown Bay Academy like Ryde Academy then the Isle of Wight, and AET, might well be looking at a success, rather than the unfolding tragedy which is taking place in Sandown Bay as AET try to close Sandown Bay Academy and displace more than 1000 children.

Controversy over closure plans
AET initially justified its decision to close Sandown Bay academy (and merge the pupils with the neighbouring Ryde Academy), by stating that the pupil numbers at Sandown Bay Academy had dropped from 2084 in 2012 to just 1157 pupils in 2017, and that the school had therefore become financially unviable and "unsustainable"

Numbers have indeed dropped at Sandown Bay Academy, but this pattern of collapsing numbers is a common pattern in AET schools which have declining standards. Everest Community Academy, for example, has dropped to the bottom 10% of schools nationally and pupil numbers have dropped by around 20%. Unity City Academy has results which place it in the bottom 10% of schools, has gone into Special Measures for the second time as an AET school and also has declining pupils drops in pupil numbers. For these reasons, local MP Andrew Turner stated that it was the drop in standards at Sandown Bay Academy which was leading to a fall in pupil numbers, a claim he backed up by referring to the large numbers of local parents coming to him saying that they did not want to send their children to AET's Sandown Bay Academy.

AET responded by trying to blame the falling numbers at Sandown Bay Academy on an over-supply of school places on the Isle of Wight. This position was described by the head of education for the Isle of Wight Local Authority as "duplicitous, destructive... (and) illiterate educational vandalism," because the number of children in the primary schools was increasing, so the Isle of Wight actually needed more secondary school capacity, not the less capacity which AET was claiming.

AET's honesty was further questioned when it was discovered that half the secondary schools in England are actually smaller than Sandown Bay Academy. and of AET's own schools Sandown Bay Academy has the 7th largest number of pupils out of 29 secondary schools. One third of AET's Secondary academies have less than 626 pupils. The Principal of Winton Community Academy, which joined AET in November 2012 said in June 2017 that, "Winton Community Academy officially has a pupil admission number of 750 and currently has 452 students on roll...we have no concerns about student numbers." These facts led to the Isle of Wight local authority referring to AET's position that Sandown Bay academy was too small to be financially viable as "tosh and twaddle."

Further doubt was cast on AET's integrity and "duplicitious" motives for wanting to close Sandown Bay Academy when AET was accused of lying that Sandown Bay Academy had had a budget deficit at the Academy in each of the three years previous to 2017, a position which was undermined when a leaked copy of the Academy budget showed no such deficit to have existed. Furthermore, of AET's 29 Academies, the AET 2016 Annual Accounts show that 11 of those Secondary academies have a far more serious budget problem than Sandown Bay Academy (and 10 of the schools are actually smaller than Sandown Bay Academy), so AET's position in singling out Sandown Bay Academy for closure appeared "duplicitious", as Councillor Whitehouse described it. This impression of deceit was reinforced when Councillor Howe said that barely a week before AET announced the closure of Sandown Bay Academy, he had been given assurances by AET executives that they were not considering closure. And so Councillor Bob Blezzard called for AET to be replaced with a more 'enlightened' academy chain.

In considering AET's behaviour counsellor Howe suggested that AET's treatment of another Isle of Wight school, Weston Academy, should be taken into account. In 2015 Weston Academy went into Special Measures, with collapsing academic standards, and AET's response was to close the school in mid year, forcing parents to find alternative schools at the last minute, whilst AET cited unviable pupil numbers as the reason for the closure. The parallels with Sandown Bay are clear. AET's conduct was branded as "appalling behaviour" by the Isle of Wight council, who then signed a motion of no confidence in AET, with all 32 members of the council unanimously calling for the AET Academy chain to be expelled from the Isle of Wight and forced to hand back all their schools on the island.

As part of AET's closure plans for Sandown Bay Academy, AET announced in May 2017 that all the pupils would be transferred and merged into Ryde Academy. Unfortunately, AET had neglected to inform the Principal and governors of Ryde Academy about their cunning plan of slipping an extra 1157 children into the classrooms of Ryde Academy, before announcing it in public; and so when the merger plan emerged Ryde Academy were vehemently opposed to the plan. Councillor Woodhouse, head of education for the Isle of Wight, said that it was shocking that AET could behave with such arrogant disdain and professional discourtesy as to not even communicate with and consult its own Principals and governing bodies about the closure and merger of the schools which they were responsible for. Newly elected MP Bob Seely went so far as to state that dealing with AET was one of his highest priorities as a new MP and that he was already in contact with government ministers, in order to eradicate AET from the Isle of Wight, a sentiment seconded by Dave Stewart, the leader of the Isle of Wight Council.

In June 2017 AET once again managed to make a public statement of its plans for Sandown Bay Academy, which it had to reverse within 24 hours because it had once again failed to consult with the Principals and staff affected by its decisions. So, on 27 June 2017 AET announced that Joy Ballard, the headteacher at Ryde Academy would be taking over at Sandown Bay Academy on 1 September 2017, an announcement which was followed the next day (28 June) by AET publicly apologising and announcing that they had "got it wrong" and that Joy Ballard would not be taking over at sandown Bay Academy. On 29 June AET announced that the new head of school would be Richard Kelly, who is suddenly available to lead Sandown Bay Academy because he had to suddenly step down in June 2017 from being headteacher of the Brune School (Gosport) (where he had been headteacher for 4 years) after OFSTED declared that academic standards in the school were poor and placed it in special measures.

The CEO of AET, Julian Drinkall, has replied to the politicians accusations against AET of dishonesty, duplicity, disingenuity, deceit, lying, talking tosh and twaddle, of being incompetent, of being financially illiterate, of carrying out educational vandalism, that AET was unfit to run schools and that AET keeps treating its own staff with 'arrogant disdain' and 'professional discourtesy,' by saying that AET was being unfairly misrepresented.

Controversy over Academy finances
In October 2014 AET was accused of poor financial management by the Education Funding Agency and ever since then it has had to operate under the financial limitations of a 'warning letter.' In 2015 AET executives moved to a building which was described as a "new flashy headquarters" in London, claiming that the new building was nearer to a railway station (despite the fact that their former headquarters at Hockley in Essex (postcode SS5 4HS) had been just 2 minutes walk away from Hockley railway station). Having made their move to a London headquarters, AET announced a £1.5m deficit budget for its headquarters "central services" team.

In 2016 AET proposed a controversial plan to save money by sacking caretakers across their schools. It was in this context that AET also suddenly announced a need to save £850,000 at Sandown Bay Academy, a sum which seemed to be so excessive (and so surprisingly close to the -£830,000 deficit which their 2016 annual accounts recorded for their central headquarters team),  that it immediately gave rise to allegations that AET were secretly trying to take money out of Sandown Bay Academy in order to subsidise its financial problems elsewhere; a claim which AET flatly denied. However, when staff from Sandown Bay Academy passed documents to the local authority which contradicted AET's claims, amidst claims of acting "disingenuously", AET suddenly backed down and reduced the sum which it urgently needed to save to £430,000, which was then further reduced to a need to save £250,000 over two years. If Sandown Bay Academy's finances were truly in the parlous state implied by AET, critics asked why would AET have chosen to spend £1,096 buying new flagpoles for Sandown Bay Academy in 2016.

AET already take 5% of each AET school's budget, as a central "management fee," to fund the £10,045,000 per year cost of their headquarters "central services" team. With an annual budget at Ryde of £5m and £7m at Sandown Bay Academy this means that more than half a million pounds per year (or £2.5m over the time that AET has managed the Isle of Wight schools) is being removed from Isle of Wight by AET as its "management fee." AET's costs include the £950,000 per year (plus pension contributions) which they spend on paying the top 6 AET executives, a commitment to apple Laptops for executives, the Westfield private health scheme, £3m spent "restructuring staff" in 2015 and 2016, the £25,000 claimed by the CEO in expenses (in addition to the £240,000 salary) and the £10m spent on legal fees (£5,116,000 in 2016 and £5,927,000 in 2015) resolving problems in their schools.

The Governors of Sandown Bay Academy went public with their concerns about AET, claiming "a lack of clarity, honesty and efficiency" by AET and stating: "we unanimously support Sandown Bay Academy being removed from the mismanagement of AET." Examples of mismanagement which have been put to AET include unfairly dismissing staff at a cost of £34,000 (plus legal fees), paying educational consultants £1000 per day (a rate branded "extortionate" when paid by another failing academy chain) and allegations of nepotistic payments by AET staff to family members, as well as a misuse of public money in the region of £250,000 paying staff to sit at home on full pay after the staff raised concerns about the conduct of the CEO of AET; whose resignation in Nov 2016 coincided with the staff resignation letter accusing AET executives of a failure of ethical standards and non-compliance with the Nolan Principles requirement that staff behave honestly. As more of AET's behaviour with Sandown Bay Academy has emerged, Councillor Julia Baker-Smith said that the council was "appalled" at AET's behaviour and Councillor Whitehouse said that AET should be apologising to the parents of the island for letting down their children.

Ultimately AET was accused by the Isle of Wight authorities of acting in a high handed "crass" way, treating the island like an annoying pimple on the AET backside, vandalistically trying to close a school which they couldn't improve, "disingenuously" citing dubious financial factors as an excuse to hide their failure and ulterior motives, and in the process levelling the Local Authority with a new, unfunded completely unnecessary and totally unfair £1m a year bill, which would be the cost of bussing all the children to other schools if AET got their way and closed down Sandown Bay Academy.

AET describes itself as "the education provider of choice for students" and as a "trailblazer in education." According to the "Local Schools Network," AET "choice" is looking hollow and trailblazing is looking more like a scorched earth strategy on the Isle of Wight. Councillor Whitehouse has gone so far as to argue that the conduct of Academies Enterprise Trust falls so far below what the public should be able to expect of an Academy Chain that AET are simply not "fit" to run schools, and that they are actually bringing the entire government sponsored academies programme into disrepute because of their "incompetence." However, AET should not be underestimated as they have demonstrated one unique ability: creating a "catastrophic breakdown in confidence" of them which united politicians across the entire spectrum of political opinion in the 2017 general election. Whilst the politicians couldn't agree on anything else, the one thing they could agree on was that AET needed to be removed from the Isle of Wight.

Popular culture
The 1973 box office hit That'll Be the Day, starring David Essex, Rosemary Leach and Ringo Starr, was filmed on the Isle of Wight, particularly at Sandown High School, Shanklin beach and in Wroxall.

Notable alumni
 Jess Andrews - British long-distance runner
 Louis Attrill - Olympic gold medallist.
 Andrew Booth - Drummer for pop-punk quartet Go:Audio.
 Rowland Charles Gould - Guitarist for jazz-funk quartet Level 42.
 Phil Gould - Drummer for jazz-funk quartet Level 42.
 Laura Michelle Kelly - Olivier award-winning actress.
 Allan Lake - Radio presenter, polymath.
 Mark and Melanie Litten - Founder members of indiepop band Trixie's Big Red Motorbike.
 Anthony Minghella - Film director.
 David Pugh - Local councillor and current leader of the Isle of Wight Council.
 Evelyn Tubb - Vocalist with early music ensemble the Consort of Musicke.

References

External links
School website

Defunct schools on the Isle of Wight
Academies Enterprise Trust
Sandown
Educational institutions disestablished in 2018
2018 disestablishments in England